San Juan del Monte is a municipality and town located in the province of Burgos, Castile and León, Spain.

Municipalities in the Province of Burgos